Borror is a surname almost exclusively found in the United States where it was adopted by German immigrants as the Americanized spelling of the German occupational surname Bohrer. Notable people with this name include:

Connie M. Borror (1966–2016), American statistician and industrial engineer
Donald J. Borror (1907–1988), American entomologist
Randy Borror (born 1957), American politician

References

Surnames of German origin
Americanized surnames